Leonardo Daniel Abelenda Rodríguez (born 10 February 1986, in Montevideo) is a Uruguayan footballer currently playing for Plaza Colonia in the Uruguayan Segunda División.

He is well known for Danubio fans for scoring a wonderful free-kick goal in the 2008 Copa Libertadores against Lanús. He had a season abroad in the Costa Rican Primera División with San Carlos.

References

Honours 
Danubio
 Uruguayan League: 2006–07

External links 
 
 

1986 births
Living people
Footballers from Montevideo
Association football defenders
Uruguayan footballers
Danubio F.C. players
Villa Española players
C.A. Rentistas players
A.D. San Carlos footballers
Plaza Colonia players
Expatriate footballers in Costa Rica